Cancer Nursing is a bi-monthly peer-reviewed nursing journal covering problems arising in the care and support of cancer patients from prevention and early detection, to all treatment modalities, and specific nursing interventions. It is published by Wolters Kluwer.

History 
The journal was established in 1978, with Rachel Ayers and Carol Reed-Ash as its founding editors. Its current editor-in-chief is Pamela S. Hinds (George Washington University).

Abstracting and indexing 
The journal is abstracted and indexed in:

 CINAHL
 MEDLINE
 PubMed

According to the Journal Citation Reports, the journal has a 2017 impact factor of 1.844.

References

External links
 

Oncology nursing journals
Wolters Kluwer academic journals
Publications established in 1978
Bimonthly journals
English-language journals